Aureopteryx is a genus of moths of the family Crambidae.

Species
Aureopteryx argentistriata 
Aureopteryx calistoalis (Walker, 1859)
Aureopteryx glorialis (Schaus, 1920)
Aureopteryx infuscatalis 
Aureopteryx olufsoni Solis & Adamski, 1998

References

Glaphyriinae
Crambidae genera
Taxa named by Hans Georg Amsel